Craptignapa is a genus of moths of the family Erebidae described by Ian W. B. Nye in 1975. Its only species, Craptignapa delicata, was first described by George Thomas Bethune-Baker in 1906. It is found in New Guinea.

References

Calpinae
Monotypic moth genera